William Frederick Gardner (born July 19, 1927) is an American former professional baseball player, coach and manager. During his ten-season active career in the major leagues, Gardner was a scrappy, light-hitting second baseman for the New York Giants, Baltimore Orioles, Washington Senators/Minnesota Twins, New York Yankees and Boston Red Sox. His only significant time on any team was with Baltimore, where he spent four consecutive full seasons from 1956 to 1959. After retiring as a player, he spent over 20 years as a coach or manager, and  managed the Minnesota Twins and Kansas City Royals during the 1980s.

MLB playing career
Born in Waterford, Connecticut, Gardner was signed by the Giants in 1945 and came up with them on April 22, 1954, but he could not break into the contending team's lineup. In early 1956, he was purchased by the Orioles. Gardner picked up a career-high of 10 steals, but in his best season of 1957, he led the league in doubles with 36, and at bats with 644. He played in every one of the 154 games that season, batting .262 with 6 home runs and 55 RBIs. In his career, Gardner also came in the top 10 in hit by pitches twice (1956 and 1957), with a career-high of 8 in 1957 (fifth in the league).

He wound up as a utility infielder with 1961 Yankees, winning the 1961 World Series with them against the Cincinnati Reds. In his one and only at bat of the post-season, he lined out to shortstop in the ninth inning of Game 2. The Yankees lost the game 6–2. Gardner ended his career with two years on the Red Sox, picking up 70 hits with them in 283 at bats. Nicknamed "Shotgun" for his rifle arm, Gardner led American League second basemen in fielding percentage in 1957 (.987), including 55 consecutive errorless games, and finished with a .976 fielding mark all-time. In all or parts of ten seasons, Gardner batted .237 with 41 home runs and 271 RBIs in 1,034 games played. He picked up 841 hits, with 159 doubles and 18 triples in 3,544 career at bats. He finished with 19 career steals.

As a manager and coach
After finishing his career with the Red Sox, Gardner stayed in the Boston organization for eight more seasons as a minor league coach and manager (1964; 1967–71) and major league third-base coach (1965–66). He then managed in the Kansas City Royals farm system from 1972 to 1976, coached at first base for the Montreal Expos in 1977–78, and was a skipper in the Montreal farm system in 1979–80.

Gardner rejoined the Twins as a third-base coach for the 1981 season. He was promoted to manager on May 23, 1981, replacing Johnny Goryl, and served until June 21, 1985, never leading Minnesota to the playoffs and avoiding a losing record only once (1984, at 81–81). Gardner incorporated young players such as Kent Hrbek, Kirby Puckett, Frank Viola and Tim Laudner into the Twin lineup, beginning the foundation of the club's two World Series clubs to come. After a 268–353 record with Minnesota, Gardner received a second chance to manage with the 1987 Royals. Gardner initially signed as the Royals' 1987 third-base coach, but terminally ill Royals manager Dick Howser, diagnosed with a malignant brain tumor during the summer of 1986, was forced to retire during spring training, and Gardner was promoted to fill the vacancy. He was fired on August 28 of that year after going 62–64, and John Wathan took over. His career record as a manager was 330–417, a .442 winning percentage.

Family
Gardner's son, Billy Jr., a former minor league infielder, is a manager in the Miami Marlins' farm system, currently with the Beloit Sky Carp. Gardner Jr. was the Nationals' minor league coordinator in 2018 and 2019 and the manager for the Harrisburg Senators before their 2020 season was cancelled; previously, from 2014 to 2017, he was the skipper of the Syracuse Chiefs of the International League, the Nationals' Triple-A affiliate.

See also

 List of Major League Baseball annual doubles leaders

References

External links

Klingaman, Mike. "Catching Up With...former Oriole Billy Gardner", The Toy Department (The Baltimore Sun sports blog), Sunday, August 14, 2011.
Billy Gardner Biography. SABR Biography Project. Ash, Tyler; Nowlin, Bill. Retrieved on January 24, 2016.
Venezuelan Winter League statistics. Pura Pelota. Retrieved on January 24, 2016.
1954–55 Cangrejeros de Santurce – Don Zimmer en Puerto Rico (Spanish). Béisbol 101. Colón, Jorge (2014). Retrieved on January 24, 2016.

1927 births
Living people
American expatriate baseball players in Venezuela
Baltimore Orioles players
Baseball players from Connecticut
Boston Red Sox coaches
Boston Red Sox players
Bristol Twins players
Cangrejeros de Santurce (baseball) players
Jacksonville Tars players
Jersey City Giants players
Kansas City Royals coaches
Kansas City Royals managers
Liga de Béisbol Profesional Roberto Clemente infielders
Louisville Colonels (minor league) managers
Major League Baseball first base coaches
Major League Baseball second basemen
Major League Baseball third base coaches
Minneapolis Millers (baseball) players
Minnesota Twins coaches
Minnesota Twins managers
Minnesota Twins players
Minnesota Twins scouts
Minor league baseball coaches
Montreal Expos coaches
Nashville Vols players
Navegantes del Magallanes players
New York Giants (NL) players
New York Yankees players
Ottawa Giants players
Pawtucket Red Sox managers
Pawtucket Red Sox players
People from Waterford, Connecticut
Pittsfield Red Sox players
Seattle Rainiers players
Sioux City Soos players
Washington Senators (1901–1960) players